The Marble Towers is a skyscraper in the Central Business District of Johannesburg, South Africa. It was built in 1973 and is 32 storeys tall. The building has an eight-storey parking garage attached to it. The structure is made out of a mixture of concrete and marble.

The tower is in use as commercial offices. The building was originally known as the Sanlam Centre. It is located on the corner of Jeppe and Von Wielligh Streets.

Gallery

See also 
 List of tallest buildings in South Africa
 List of tallest buildings in Africa

References

External links
 Marble Towers on CTBUH
 Marble Towers on Emporis
 Marble Towers on Skyscraperpage.com
 Marble Towers on Structurae

Skyscraper office buildings in Johannesburg
Office buildings in South Africa
Office buildings completed in 1973
1973 establishments in South Africa
20th-century architecture in South Africa